Felipe Padilla de León  (May 1, 1912 – December 5, 1992) was a Filipino classical music composer, conductor, and scholar. He was known for composing different sonatas, marches and concertos that reflect the Filipino identity.

De Leon was also recognized as a composer who experienced different regime change throughout the course of his lifetime. From the Commonwealth period up to the presidency of Ferdinand Marcos, his music became a representation of Filipino ideals and aspirations throughout the ages of Philippine history.

Early life and career 
De Leon was the third of four children by the second marriage of his mother Natalia Padilla to Juan de Leon. His father died when he was three years old, leaving his mother to raise him and his elder half-brother, Pedro P. San Diego. Before becoming a musician, he took various odd jobs to support his family, such as a shoe polisher, carabao herder, carriage driver, and vendor of various items. In 1927, he took up Fine Arts at the University of the Philippines, but he had to abandon his studies to make a living. He played the trombone in cabarets and circuses, and later worked as an assistant conductor of the Nueva Ecija High School Orchestra, where he started composing music. To improve his composing skills he again enrolled to the University of the Philippines, and graduated in 1939 with a diploma of music teacher and conductor. Much later, he continued his studies under Vittorio Giannini at the Juilliard School in New York, U.S.

De Leon married pianist Iluminada Mendoza with whom he had six children, including Bayani, a prominent composer, and Felipe Jr., a writer.

Promotion of Filipino Nationalism

Commonwealth Period

During the 1930s, there was a massive cultural movement of "Filipinism" among several Filipino artists. The reason for the movement was to promote nationalism to Filipinos and as a response to the cultural integration imposed by the United States.  

Raul Navarro, a professor at the UP College of Music, also pointed out that music education (both primary and secondary) became a means of cultural homogenization and Americanization of Filipinos during those period.

Being affected by the said movement, De Leon, along with his fellow composer Lucio San Pedro, continued the nationalist tradition of Antonio Molina, Francisco Santiago, and Nicanor Abelardo by using the material from Filipino folk songs as the basis of their own created compositions. De Leon also wrote articles and publications highlighting the importance of music as an expression of nationalism.

Japanese Occupation 
During the outbreak of World War II, De Leon was forced to compose national music for the invading Japanese. His song, "Payapang Daigdig" was also composed during this time period right after the destruction of Manila.

After independence, De Leon soon composed the symphonic poems, "The Cry of Balintawak" and "Bataan" to commemorate the Filipinos who suffered under the Japanese occupation.

Awards and honors 

 Republic Cultural Heritage Award
 Rizal Pro-Patria Award
 Presidential Award of Merit
 Patnubay ng Kalinangan Award
 Composer of the Year (1949)
 Musician of the Year (Manila, 1958)
 National Artist of the Philippines (1997)

Selected worksTiongson, Nicanor (Ed.). (1994). CCP Encyclopedia of Philippine Art (Vol. 6: Philippine music). Manila: Cultural Center of the Philippines.

Operas 

Noli me Tangere (Touch me Not), opera in 3 acts (1957)
El Filibusterismo (Subversion), opera (1970)

Concertos 

 Konzertstück for Violin and Orchestra (c. 1950s)
 Flute Concerto (1980)

Orchestral works 

 Mariang Makiling Overture (1939)
 Roca Encantada, symphonic legend (1950)
 Maynila Overture (1976)
 Tatlong Tunog Larawan (Three Sound Portraits), for orchestra (1976)
 Orchesterstück (1981)
 Manila Sketches for Orchestra (1949)
 Bataan, tone poem (1947)
 Cry of Balintawak, tone poem (1948)
 Mga Katutubong Tanawin

Marches and other works for band 

 Bagong Pagsilang (New Birth)
 Tayo’y Magtanim (Let Us Plant)
 Ang Karomata (The Carriage)
 Tindig, Aking Inang Bayan (Rise Up, My Motherland)
 Fantasy for Trombone and Band
 Mayumi Theme and Variations
 Awit ng Maynila (Song of Manila)
 Himno ng Marikina (Marikina Hymn)
 Awit ng Serbisyo Sibil (Civil Service Hymn)

Chamber 

 Fantasy for four flutes and percussion

See also
 Diwa de Leon, Felipe's grandson composer

References

1912 births
1992 deaths
National Artists of the Philippines
Filipino classical composers
Musicians from Nueva Ecija
University of the Philippines alumni
Juilliard School alumni
Filipino conductors (music)